Dasyurotaenia robusta is a species of tapeworm that only lives on Tasmanian devils.

References 

Species described in 1912
Cestoda